John Samuel Cole (born 16 December 1941) is a Scottish retired amateur football wing half who made over 100 appearances in the Scottish League for Queen's Park. He later played in Australia for Pan Hellenic and was capped by Scotland at amateur level.

Personal life 
Cole attended Holyrood Secondary School.

Honours 
Scotland Amateurs
 FA Centenary Amateur International Tournament

References

Scottish footballers
Scottish Football League players
Queen's Park F.C. players
Association football wing halves
Living people
1941 births
Footballers from Glasgow
Scottish expatriate footballers
Scottish expatriate sportspeople in Australia
People educated at Holyrood Secondary School
Scotland amateur international footballers